Centurio may refer to:

Centurio senex, binomial name of the Wrinkle-faced bat
Clan Centurio, a clan from Final Fantasy XII

See also

Centurion, ancient Roman army officer rank